Lady Anastasia is a superyacht.

Lady Anastasia may also refer to:

People
 Lady Anastasia Jessey Guthrie Gascoigne of St. Petersburg (1782–1855), wife of Charles Gascoigne and daughter of Matthew Guthrie, paramour to George Glasse
 Lady Anastasia Holman (17th century), daughter of William Howard, 1st Viscount Stafford
 Anastasia de Torby (1892–1977), Lady Anastasia (Zia) Michaelovna Wernher, CBE

Other uses
 Lady Anastasia, a fictional character from the TV series The Great
 Lady Anastasia, a winner of the English Greyhound Derby Invitation

See also
 Anastasia (given name)
 Anastasia (surname)
 Anastasia (disambiguation)
 Princess Anastasia (disambiguation)
 Anastasia of Russia (disambiguation)
 Anastasia Romanova (disambiguation)